This discography is a list of singles and albums released by Cilla Black in her career.

Singles
A-side and B-side configurations refer to UK releases (unless otherwise indicated). A-sides and B-sides may differ in other territories.

 When Cilla appeared on Top of the Pops in 1977, she performed the 'B Side' of the single Keep Your Mind On Love.

Solo albums
Cilla (1965, No. 5)
Is It Love? (1965, US only)
Cilla Sings a Rainbow (1966, No. 4)
Cilla Sings a Rainbow (Japanese edition) (1966, Japan only)
Sher-oo! (1968, No. 7)
Surround Yourself with Cilla (1969)
Sweet Inspiration (1970, No. 42)
Images (1971)
Day by Day with Cilla (1973)
In My Life (1974)
It Makes Me Feel Good (1976)
Modern Priscilla (1978)
Especially for You (1980)
Surprisingly Cilla (1985)
Cilla's World (1990)
Through the Years (1993, No. 41)
Beginnings: Greatest Hits & New Songs (2003, No. 68)
Beginnings: Revisited (2009) (Digital download featuring previously unreleased tracks)
Cilla All Mixed Up (2009) (Digital download)

Compilation albums
The Best of Cilla Black (1968, No. 21)
The Very Best of Cilla Black (1983, No. 20)
Love, Cilla (1993)
 You're My World – Her Greatest Hits (1995)
1963-1973: The Abbey Road Decade (3CD) (1997)
The 35th Anniversary Collection (1998)
 The Essential Cilla Black (1999)
 Cilla Black: The Story (2001)
The Best of Cilla Black (Special Edition) (2002)
Cilla: The Best of 1963–78 (3CD) (2003)
Cilla in the 60s (2005)
Cilla in the 70s (2005)
The Definitive Collection (A Life in Music) [2CD + PAL Region 0 DVD] (2009)
Completely Cilla: 1963-1973 [5CD + NTSC Region 0 DVD] (2012)
The Very Best of Cilla Black [50th Anniversary Collection] [CD + PAL Region 0 DVD] (2013, No. 1) 
Hit Singles (2015)
Her All-Time Greatest Hits (2017)
Cilla (with the Royal Philharmonic Orchestra) (2018, No. 26)

Notes

References

Pop music discographies
Discographies of British artists
Discography